Édouard Delmont (5 December 1883 – 22 November 1955) was a French actor born Édouard Marius Autran in Marseille. He died in Cannes at age 72.

Filmography

1930 : L'Arlésienne de Jacques de Baroncelli
1930 : Maison de danses de Maurice Tourneur
1931 : Mardi gras de Pierre Weill
1931 : Marius d' Alexander Korda
1931 : Mam'zelle Nitouche, de Marc Allégret, Le directeur du music-hall
1932 : Fanny de Marc Allégret, Le docteur Félicien Venelle
1932 : Amour et Biceps – court métrage – de Jack Windrow
1933 : Roger la Honte de Gaston Roudès, L'inspecteur
1933 : Au pays du soleil, de Robert Péguy, (Opérette).
1933 : Jofroi de Marcel Pagnol
1933 : L'Illustre Maurin d'André Hugon
1933 : Chourinette d'André Hugon
1934 : Angèle de Marcel Pagnol, Amédée
1934 : Le Train de 8 heures 47, L'éteigneur de réverbères
1934 : Les Bleus de la marine de Maurice Cammage, Le quartier-maître
1935 : Toni ou Les Amours de Toni de Jean Renoir, Fernand
1935 : Le Gros Lot de Cornembuis – court métrage – d'André Hugon, Bolduc
1936 : César de Marcel Pagnol, Le docteur Félicien Venelle
1936 : Romarin de Pierre Caron
1936 : Blanchette d' André Hugon, Le docteur Bonenfant
1936 : Joseph, tu m'énerves!! – court métrage – de Georges Winter
1937 : Regain de Marcel Pagnol, Le père Gaubert
1937 : The Secrets of the Red Sea de Richard Pottier
1937 : The Strange Monsieur Victor de Jean Grémillon, Paroli
1937 : Le Chanteur de minuit de Léo Joannon, Fontana ? ou Patard ?
1937 : Franco de port de Dimitri Kirsanoff
1937 : Balthazar de Pierre Colombier, Balicot
1938 : Hercule d' Alexander Esway
1938 : La Marseillaise de Jean Renoir, Cabri, le paysan
1938 : Port of Shadows de Marcel Carné, Panama
1938 : La Femme du boulanger de Marcel Pagnol, Maillefer
1938 : Le Club des fadas, d' Émile Couzinet
1938 : The Little Thing de Maurice Cloche, L'abbé Germane
1938 : Firmin le muet de Saint-Pataclet de Jacques Séverac, Toinet
1938 : Farinet ou l'or dans la montagne de Max Haufler : Fontana
1939 : Le Héros de la Marne d' André Hugon, Le père Bardin
1939 : Berlingot and Company de Fernand Rivers, Courtepatte
1939 : Le Déserteur ou Je t'attendrai de Léonide Moguy, Le père, M. Marchand'
1939 : Le Paradis des voleurs (Escapade) de L.-C. Marsoudet et Léo Joannon, L'oncle Roquefigue1940 : The Mondesir Heir d' Albert Valentin, Firmin1940 : The Marvelous Night de Jean-Paul Paulin, Le vieux berger1941 : Trois Argentins à Montmartre d' André Hugon, Sacrifice1941 : Notre-Dame de la Mouise de Robert Péguy, Le père Didier1941 : Parade en sept nuits de Marc Allégret, Long-Pendu1942 : Soyez les bienvenus de Jacques de Baroncelli
1942 : L'Arlésienne de Marc Allégret, Le berger Balthazar1942 : Simplet de Fernandel
1942 : Cap au large de Jean-Paul Paulin
1942 : Feu sacré de Maurice Cloche, Papa Bricard1943 : A Woman in the Night de Edmond T. Gréville
1943 : Le soleil a toujours raison de Pierre Billon
1943 : Port d'attache de Jean Choux
1943 : Picpus de Richard Pottier
1943 : La Bonne Étoile de Jean Boyer
1943 : Une vie de chien de Maurice Cammage
1943 : Adieu Léonard de Pierre Prévert
1943 : Le Val d'enfer de Maurice Tourneur
1943 : Mon amour est près de toi de Richard Pottier
1944 : Un chapeau de paille d'Italie de Maurice Cammage – tourné en 1940
1944 : La Collection Ménard de Bernard Roland
1944 : The Island of Love de Maurice Cam
1945 : La Fiancée des ténèbres de Serge de Poligny
1945 : Solita de Cordoue de Willy Rozier
1946 : L'Affaire du Grand Hôtel de André Hugon
1946 : Le Gardian de Jean de Marguenat
1946 : La Nuit sans fin de Jacques Séverac
1946 : Ploum ploum, tra la la de Robert Hennion
1947 : La Renégate de Jacques Séverac
1947 : Le Destin exécrable de Guillemette Babin de Guillaume Radot
1947 : Le Dessous des cartes d'André Cayatte
1947 : Colomba de Émile Couzinet
1948 : Buffalo Bill et la bergère de Serge de La Roche – film resté inachevé –
1948 : Bagarres de Henri Calef
1948 : L'Auberge du péché de Jean de Marguenat
1949 : L'École buissonnière de Jean-Paul Le Chanois
1949 : The Man Who Returns from Afar de Jean Castanier
1949 : Les Eaux troubles de Henri Calef
1949 : Two Loves de Richard Pottier
1950 : Le Grand Cirque de Georges Peclet
1950 : The Man Who Returns from Afar1950 : Juliette ou la Clé des songes de Marcel Carné
1950 : La Belle que voilà de Jean-Paul Le Chanois
1951 : Trafic sur les dunes de Jean Gourguet
1951 : Monsieur Octave ou L'escargot de Maurice Téboul – film inédit –
1951 : La Table aux crevés de Henri Verneuil Capucet1952 : Au pays du soleil de Maurice de Canonge
1952 : Éternel espoir de Max Joly
1952 : Son dernier Noël de Jacques Daniel-Norman
1952 : Manon des sources de Marcel Pagnol
1953 : The Return of Don Camillo de Julien Duvivier
1953 : The Call of Destiny de Georges Lacombe
1954 : Le Mouton à cinq pattes de Henri Verneuil
1954 : Letters from My Windmill de Marcel Pagnol dans le sketch : Le Secret de maître Cornille et le sketch inédit : La Diligence de Beaucaire
1954 : Ali Baba and the Forty Thieves de Jacques Becker, Le père de Morgiane Bibliography 
 Raymond Chirat; Olivier Barrot, Les excentriques du cinéma français : 1929–1958, Paris : Henri Veyrier, 1983. 
 Yvan Foucart: Dictionnaire des comédiens français disparus'', Mormoiron : Éditions cinéma, 2008, 1185 p.

External links

1883 births
1955 deaths
French male film actors
Male actors from Marseille
20th-century French male actors